Lirong Kawit is a settlement in the Miri division of Sarawak, Malaysia.

Neighbouring settlements include:

References

Miri Division
Populated places in Sarawak